Joachim Schmettau (born 5 February 1937, Bad Doberan, Mecklenburg) is a German sculptor.

Life 
Schmettau has been living in Berlin since 1945. From 1966 to 1990, he participated as a member of the Deutscher Künstlerbund at a total of 18 large annual DKB exhibitions. He was a founding member of the Gruppe Aspekt of the Berlin Critical Realists in 1972.

From 1971 to 2002, Schmettau was a professor at the Berlin University of the Arts.

Awards 
 1968 Villa Romana prize, Florence
 1970/1971 Villa Massimo Prize, Rome
 1971 Medaglia d'oro, premio del Fiorino, Florence
 1977 Berliner Kunstpreis 
 1980 Kunstpreis der Künstler, Düsseldorf

Works 
His first works were in sandstone as well as in plaster and stucco. In the 1960s, he began to combine various materials (bronze, glass) and smoothing the surface extremely. Figurative and geometrical elements were also combined, so that the work as a whole appears to have an intensified stylization.

His works for the public space (façade reliefs, fountains, and so on) is also extensive. His best-known work is the 1984 "Erdkugelbrunnen" on the Breitscheidplatz in Charlottenburg, also called the "Weltkugelbrunnen" or the "Wasserklops".

Public projects (selection) 

 1975 Bronze sculpture Hand mit Uhr, Berlin-Hansaviertel
 1978 University Library Freiburg, Bridge sculptures
 1982 Figurine group for the Deutschen Hof in Güglingen
 1985 Tanzendes Paar, Berlin-Neukölln, Hermannplatz
 1986 Music fountain, Düsseldorf (Grabenstraße for the Wilhelm Marx House)
 1989 Europabrunnen (Dortmund), well installation consisting of 2 wells (Hellweg)
 1996 Sculpture Frau, sich die Maske abnehmend for the Kreissparkasse Heilbronn
 1998 Brunnen Tanzende Figur, Waldplatz, Leipzig
 2010 Musikant, Löhne Music School, bronze figure for Tänzerin with Susanne Wehland

Exhibitions (selection)  

 1970 Joachim Schmettau : Plastik und Zeichnungen, Kunsthalle Mannheim (mit Katalog)
 1978 Joachim Schmettau. Plastiken, Zeichnungen, Studio Jaeschke, Bochum
 1980/81 Joachim Schmettau - Skulpturen und Zeichnungen 1960 - 1980, Kunstverein Hannover; Städtische Museen Heilbronn, Deutschhof-Museum (mit Katalog)
 1987 Joachim Schmettau, Neuer Berliner Kunstverein, Staatliche Kunsthalle Berlin (mit Katalog)
 1993 Joachim Schmettau : Skulpturen, Bilder, Zeichnungen, Galerie Eva Poll, Berlin (mit Katalog)
 2002/03 Neue Skulpturen, Galerie Poll, Berlin
 2004 SOMMERLUST - KUNST-STÜCKE, Galerie Rothe, Frankfurt
 2007 Joachim Schmettau - Skulpturen und Architekturmodelle, Galerie der Kunststiftung Poll, Berlin

Exhibitions at home and abroad (selection) 
 1963 XIII. Jahresausstellung, Neuer Darmstädter Sezession
 1964 13. Ausstellung des Deutschen Künstlerbund, Academy of Arts, Berlin, Hochschule für bildende Künste und Haus am Waldsee (ebenfalls in 1966, 1967, 1968, 1969, 1970, 1973, 1974,1976, 1978, 1979, 1981 und 1986)
 1965 Große Berliner Kunstausstellung, Messehallen Berlin
 1973 Prinzip Realismus, Akademie der Künste Berlin
 1980 Große Kunstausstellung Düsseldorf, Kunstpalast Ehrenhof, Düsseldorf (ebenfalls in 1981, 1983, 1084, und 1985)
 1996 VIII. Biennale Internazionale di Scultura, Accademia di Belle Arti
 2000 Auf den Punkt gebracht. Porzellane für Meissen - Max Adolf Pfeiffer zu Ehren, Leipzig Museum of Applied Arts, Leipzig
 2005 Große Kunstausstellung NRW Düsseldorf 
 2008 L'Accademia Nazionale di San Luca per una collezione del disegno contemporaneo Accademia di San Luca
 2010 Glückwunsch, Forum Kunst (1970-1010)!, Forum Kunst Rottweil

Works in public collections  
 Osthaus-Museum Hagen, Hagen
 Kunstmuseum Bonn
 Neue Nationalgalerie, Berlin
 Berlin State Museums
 Lehmbruck Museum, Duisburg
 Galleria d'arte moderna e contemporanea (Bergamo)
 Bavarian State Painting Collections
 Berlinische Galerie – State Museum of Modern Art, Berlin
 Kunsthalle Mannheim
 Museum Bochum – Kunstsammlung
 Niedersächsisches Landesmuseum für Kunst und Kulturgeschichte, Oldenburg
 Beelden aan Zee, The Hague-Scheveningen
 Museum Pfalzgalerie Kaiserslautern
 Bundeskunstsammlung, Collection of Contemporary Art of the Federal Republic of Germany
 Städtische Museen Heilbronn

Literature 
 Lothar C. Poll (Hrsg.): Joachim Schmettau : Zeichnungen 1967-1981, ein Alphabet. (Werkübersicht aus Anlass der Ausstellung der Zeichnungen von Joachim Schmettau in der Galerie Poll im April 1982). Galerie Poll, Berlin 1982,  (Poll-Editionen. Bd. 1).
 Joachim Schmettau: Skulpturen. Stock-und-Stein-Verlag, Schwerin [2000].
 Joachim Schmettau: Zeichnungen. Stock-und-Stein-Verlag, Schwerin [2000]
 Joachim Schmettau: Skulpturen 2003–2010. Nicolai-Verlag, Berlin [2011]. 
 Joachim Schmettau: Architekturphantasien. Nicolai-Verlag, Berlin [2015].

References

External links 
 

 Report on the Wasserklops in Tagesspiegel
 Joachim Schmettau, gallery of the Poll Berlin

1937 births
Living people
People from Bad Doberan
People from Mecklenburg
German sculptors
Academic staff of the Berlin University of the Arts